Garmez may refer to:
 Garmez-e Olya
 Garmez-e Sofla